Sikandar Hayat Khan Sherpao (سکندر حیات خان شیرپاؤ) is a Pakistani politician who had been a Member of the Provincial Assembly of Khyber Pakhtunkhwa, from 2002 to May 2018. He also served as Senior Minister for home and tribal affairs as well as irrigation department.

Education
He has a degree  in Bachelors in Arts  and a degree in Bachelor of Business Administration.

Political career

He was elected to the Provincial Assembly of the North-West Frontier Province as a candidate of Pakistan People's Party (S) (PPP-S) from Constituency PF-21 (Charsadda-V) in 2002 Pakistani general election. He received 15,153 votes and defeated a candidate of Awami National Party (ANP).

He was re-elected to the Provincial Assembly of the North-West Frontier Province as a candidate of PPP-S from Constituency PF-21 (Charsadda-V) in 2008 Pakistani general election. He received 12,303 votes and defeated a candidate of ANP.

He was re-elected to the Provincial Assembly of Khyber Pakhtunkhwa as a candidate of Qaumi Watan Party from Constituency PK-21 (Charsadda-V) in 2013 Pakistani general election. He received 17,052 votes and defeated a candidate of Awami National Party. He took oath as senior minister for home and tribal affairs as well as irrigation department in Oct,2015 whereas he resigned from his post as senior minister in JUL 2017.

External links
 Official Twitter
 Official Facebook

References

Living people
Khyber Pakhtunkhwa MPAs 2013–2018
North-West Frontier Province MPAs 2002–2007
Khyber Pakhtunkhwa MPAs 2008–2013
Year of birth missing (living people)